James M. Honea is a United States Navy Sailor serving as the 16th Master Chief Petty Officer of the Navy (MCPON) since 8 September 2022. He previously was the Senior Enlisted Leader (SEL) of United States Indo-Pacific Command. He served in that role from August of 2021 to June of 2022.

Naval career
He continued to rise through the ranks serving aboard amphibious assault ships. When he achieved the rank of command master chief, he continued to serve at sea aboard the destroyer , and later another amphibious assault ship .

Honea's shore tours include service as the command master chief of U.S. Navy Embedded Training Teams, Combined Joint Task Force Phoenix, deployed to Afghanistan; as the command master chief at Naval Support Activity South Potomac; as the command master chief of U.S. Naval Forces Korea; and most recently as the fleet master chief of U.S. Pacific Fleet.

Honea completed the Command Master Chief Course and Senior Enlisted JPME Keystone Course at the National Defense University. He is also a graduate from the U.S. Air Force Senior Non-Commissioned Officer Academy.

He assumed the office of Master Chief Petty Officer of the Navy on September 8, 2022 from MCPON Smith.

Personal life
Honea married Evelyn in 1989 when he was stationed in Long Beach, California. They have two children, James who is twenty-nine and Sara who is twenty-four.

Awards and decorations

Eight gold service stripes

References 

|-

Year of birth missing (living people)
Living people
Master Chief Petty Officers of the United States Navy
Recipients of the Legion of Merit